Yuki Bhambri won the title, beating Evgeny Donskoy 6–2, 7–6(7–4)

Seeds

Draw

Finals

Top half

Bottom half

References
 Main Draw
 Qualifying Draw

KPIT MSLTA Challenger - Singles